Austrosetia is a genus of moths in the family Sesiidae containing only one species, Austrosetia semirufa, which is known from South Africa.

References

Endemic moths of South Africa
Sesiidae
Moths of Africa